Eleventh Hour is an American science-based drama television series, which is based on the 2006 British series of the same name. The series was a joint venture between Jerry Bruckheimer Television, Granada America and Warner Bros. Television. The series ran on CBS for one season from October 9, 2008 to April 2, 2009.

Plot
Eleventh Hour follows Dr. Jacob Hood (Rufus Sewell), a brilliant biophysicist and Special Science Adviser for the FBI who is brought in to investigate crimes of a scientific nature that other agents may be unable to solve. Hood is the government's last line of defense, and it is his mission to keep scientific advances out of the hands of those with nefarious intentions. Special Agent Rachel Young (Marley Shelton), of the FBI's executive protection detail, is assigned to protect Hood. Both Dr. Hood and Special Agent Young are assisted by Special Agent Felix Lee (Omar Benson Miller), towards the end of the series.

Cast and characters
Rufus Sewell as Dr. Jacob Hood – a science adviser to the FBI, called in to investigate crimes that may have a scientific explanation. Even though Hood is extremely brilliant, he sometimes gets lost in his own thoughts, and this, coupled with his low attention span and poor social skills, causes him to be viewed as odd. He also has few instincts of self-preservation or danger, causing him to often do things that put his life in jeopardy, such as standing in front of a fleeing suspect's car to get the license plate, something that frequently annoys Rachel. Additionally, he does not know how to drive well, leading Rachel to insist she do all the driving. Hood appears to be an atheist and is knowledgeable on a number of scientific, mathematical and philosophical topics. He nursed his wife, who died of cancer, throughout her illness.
Marley Shelton as FBI Special Agent Rachel Young – Hood's handler. Though she is employed to protect his life, she has also said that her job is "to protect him from himself" – something he makes very difficult for her. Hood might annoy her from time to time but she does care about his well-being, viewing his many techniques with a kind of exasperated affection, though she is frequently embarrassed by and for him. Rachel mainly gets annoyed when he gets too caught up in an investigation and does something stupid, or when he does things like accidentally sit on his panic button. It is noted throughout the series that Dr. Hood is her only friend, though male characters frequently flirt with her. She is the latest in a line of Hood's protectors, but she refuses to let him "drive her away like he did those others."
Omar Benson Miller as FBI Special Agent Felix Lee (episodes 14–18) – introduced later in the series when he asks (although it is later discovered that he begged) to help Jacob Hood on a case. After solving the case, he asks to work with Hood full-time, stating that the work they do is amazing. Felix is given the job and works as somewhat of a scout, helping out the team with heading to the location and gathering the material they need by the time Hood and Young get there. Though he likes the job, Felix feels underappreciated due to the lack of praise for the amount of work he does.

Production

Development
The original ITV version ran for four 90-minute episodes. Before the American remake series premiered, CBS ordered 13 one-hour episodes. The pilot episode was produced with a budget of four million dollars, and the remaining episodes were given approximately two million dollars each. Despite shooting "Agro" as a second possible pilot, CBS premiered the series with its original $4 million pilot, "Resurrection", instead.

Cancellation
The show was canceled on May 19, 2009, due to its inability to hold the CSI audience lead-in. Upon learning of Eleventh Hour'''s cancellation, a small core group of fans banded together to form the Eleventh Hour Resurrection Campaign.  They were unsuccessful in convincing another television network to pick up the show.

Episodes

DVD release
Warner Brothers released the complete series on DVD in Region 1 on October 20, 2009 via their Warner Archive Collection.  This is a Manufacture-on-Demand (MOD) release and is available through Warner's online store and Amazon.com. The series is only available online as a pay-per-episode offering on Vudu.

Reception

Critical
Despite the absence of any supernatural or science fictional elements, some critics compared the series to The X-Files. Eleventh Hour debuted after CSI at 10:00 but at 11.6 million viewers retained only 50% of CSI's audience. The show came in second in its timeslot after the premiere of Life on Mars. Although Life on Mars lost 27% of its audience in its second week, Eleventh Hour gained numbers and saw a further gain in its third week, leading CBS to increase its script order. On December 2, 2008, TV Guide reported that CBS has ordered five additional scripts bringing the series’ total number of episodes to 18. On Rotten Tomatoes, Eleventh Hour has an aggregate score of 35% based on 6 positive and 11 negative critic reviews. The website’s consensus reads: "A cardboard cut-out drama that fails to wow, Eleventh Hour relies too heavily on formula and not enough in its star power."

The Biotechnology Industry Organization launched a blog, EleventhHourFacts.com, which features subject matter experts discussing the scientific basis of each episode through video interviews, live episode blogging and posts.

Ratings

Seasonal rankings (based on average total viewers per episode) of Eleventh Hour''.
Each U.S. network television season starts in late September and ends in late May, which coincides with the completion of May sweeps.

References

External links
 

2000s American drama television series
2008 American television series debuts
2009 American television series endings
CBS original programming
American television series based on British television series
American thriller television series
Television series about cloning
Television series by ITV Studios
Television series by Warner Bros. Television Studios
English-language television shows
Television shows set in Los Angeles
Television shows filmed in Los Angeles